Epic Records is an American record label owned by Sony Music Entertainment, a subsidiary of Sony Corporation of America, the North American division of Japanese conglomerate Sony. The label was founded predominantly as a jazz and classical music label in 1953, but later expanded its scope to include a more diverse range of genres, including pop, R&B, rock, and hip hop.

History

Beginnings
Epic Records was launched in 1953 by the Columbia Records unit of CBS, for the purpose of marketing jazz, pop, and classical music that did not fit the theme of its more mainstream Columbia Records label. Initial classical music releases were from Philips Records which distributed Columbia product in Europe.  Pop talent on co-owned Okeh Records were transferred to Epic which made Okeh a rhythm and blues label. Epic's bright-yellow, black, and blue logo became a familiar trademark for many jazz and classical releases. This has included such notables as the Berlin Philharmonic, Charles Rosen, the Juilliard String Quartet, Antal Doráti conducting the Hague Philharmonic, and George Szell conducting the Cleveland Orchestra.

Expansion of genres and mainstream success
By 1960, Epic became better known for its signing of newer, fledgling acts. By the end of the 1960s, Epic earned its first gold records and had evolved into a formidable hit-making force in rock and roll, R&B and country music. Among its many acts, it included Roy Hamilton, Bobby Vinton, the Dave Clark Five, the Hollies, Tammy Wynette, Donovan, the Yardbirds, Lulu, July, Helen Shapiro, and Jeff Beck. Several of the British artists on the Epic roster during the 1960s were the result of CBS's Epic/Okeh units' international distribution deal with EMI; Epic recordings were issued by EMI on the Columbia label.

Epic was involved in a notable "trade" of artists. Graham Nash was signed to Epic because of his membership in The Hollies. When the newly formed Crosby, Stills & Nash wanted to sign with Atlantic Records, Ahmet Ertegun worked out a deal with Clive Davis whereby Richie Furay's new band Poco (having signed with Atlantic due to Furay's contract from being in Buffalo Springfield) would sign with Epic.

Epic's commercial success continued to grow in the 1970s with releases from ABBA (in the UK), Boston, Cheap Trick, the Clash, Charlie Daniels, Gabriel, Heart, Heatwave, the Isley Brothers, the Jacksons, George Jones, Labelle, Meat Loaf, Johnny Nash, Ted Nugent, REO Speedwagon, Minnie Riperton, Pegasus, Charlie Rich, Sly & the Family Stone, Steve Vai, and Edgar Winter. Also contributing to the label's success was its distribution of Philadelphia International Records, which produced additional hit records by acts such as the Three Degrees and McFadden and Whitehead.

Corporate structure 
During the 1960s, Epic oversaw the smaller subsidiary CBS labels including Okeh Records and Date Records. In 1968, Epic recordings began being distributed in the UK by CBS after the distribution deal with EMI expired that year; Epic itself launched in England around 1971.

Sony Corporation bought CBS Records in 1987, and the company was renamed Sony Music in 1991. It began splitting European operations into two separate labels, Epic and Columbia, in 1992, and in 1997, Sony Music Australia and New Zealand followed suit.

In 2004, Sony merged with music distributor BMG, bringing Arista Records, Columbia Records, Epic Records, J Records, Jive Records, RCA Records, and Zomba Group of Companies to one parent company known as Sony BMG Music Entertainment. In 2008, Sony bought out BMG for $1.2 billion, bringing all affiliated labels together as Sony Music Entertainment International, SMEI. The merger was approved by the European Union in 2009.

1980s–2010
Epic was arguably the most successful label of the 1980s and its 1980s and 1990s mainstream success were fueled by its signing and releasing of albums by notable acts such as Michael Jackson, Culture Club, the Miami Sound Machine and Gloria Estefan, Wham! and George Michael, Adam Ant, Living Colour, Incubus, Dead or Alive, Europe, Cyndi Lauper, Teena Marie, Ozzy Osbourne, Korn, Pearl Jam, Sade, Luther Vandross, the Indigo Girls, Stevie Ray Vaughan, Rage Against the Machine, Céline Dion, Ginuwine, and Oasis, among many others. Michael Jackson's Thriller album, released by Epic, is the best-selling album of all time. Another one of the label's many successes came via George Michael's debut solo album Faith which is estimated to have sold 25 million copies worldwide.

Epic Soundtrax was founded in 1992. It was central to Epic's 1990s success, with 11 releases cumulatively selling more than 40 million records over a three-year period. Notable releases included soundtrack albums for Honeymoon in Vegas, Singles, Sleepless in Seattle, Forrest Gump, Philadelphia, and Judgment Night.

In 1999, Jennifer Lopez released her debut album, On the 6, as part of WORK Group which was a critical and commercial success going on to sell over 8 million copies worldwide. Lopez's sophomore album J.Lo, experienced similar success in which over 8 million copies were sold worldwide in 2001, gaining multi-platinum status under Epic Records. With this album, Lopez became the first female solo artist under the record company to reach the number one spot on the Billboard 200. The 2002 remix album J TO THA L-O! The Remixes, which served as a follow up to Lopez's sophomore effort, was the first remix album to debut at number one on the Billboard 200, and became the fourth best selling remix album of all time, behind Michael Jackson (fellow Epic Records artist), Madonna and The Beatles. What's more is, in the second week at number one for the remix album, Lopez's remix single Ain't It Funny (Murder Remix), was also number one, making Lopez the only artist in history to have a number one remix album and single in the same week. Lopez's third studio album, released in late 2002 which was also a success, This is me... Then, sold 6 million copies worldwide and peaked at the second spot of the Billboard 200. Lopez's first full-length Spanish debut, Como Ama Una Mujer, became the first Spanish-language debut album to enter the top 10 of the Billboard 200, and has sold 1 million copies worldwide. This was Lopez's final studio album under Epic Records before her move to Island Def Jam and Capitol, until she released her first greatest hits compilation, Dance Again... The Hits, gaining critical success.

In February 2009, Sony Music Group chairman Rob Stringer appointed singer-songwriter Amanda Ghost as president of Epic. Ghost, who had successfully promoted James Blunt to Grammy Award-winning status, was an unconventional and controversial choice for president because she had no corporate executive experience. She was expected to reverse the trend of declining sales at Epic by promoting the label's newer and mid-tier artists such as Augustana. Stringer also merged Epic and Columbia to form the Columbia/Epic Label Group in 2009, with himself as acting chairman. Ghost scored hit records for the Fray, Modest Mouse, Matisyahu and Sean Kingston. However, she delayed the scheduled release of Shakira's album She Wolf by insisting that the album contain another song – "Give It Up to Me" featuring Lil Wayne and uncredited Timbaland. This delay probably caused She Wolf to perform less well in the market. Epic staff members described Ghost as "abrasive" and a "loose cannon". She was fired in October 2010, with Stringer apologizing for his mistake: "I owe the people at Epic..."

2011–present 
In July 2011, L.A. Reid became the CEO of Epic Records, signing artists such as TLC, Toni Braxton, Cher Lloyd, Avril Lavigne, Outkast, Future, Yo Gotti, Ciara, Meghan Trainor, DJ Khaled, and Travis Scott. Epic also signed the winners of The X Factor during the seasons that Reid appeared on the show.

In 2013, Sylvia Rhone, former president of Universal Motown, launched the imprint Vested In Culture through Epic Records. A year later,
she was named president of Epic.

In November 2014, Mosley Music Group created a joint venture with Sony Music, with marketing, publicity, distribution and overall label services provided by Epic. The joint venture was created due to Timbaland's previous co-collaboration with Reid on Michael Jackson's posthumous album, Xscape. Previously operated by Interscope, most of MMG's roster moved to Epic.

In 2015, Def Jam Recordings parted ways with Mariah Carey and Carey reunited with Reid at Epic. She had worked with Reid at Def Jam under The Island Def Jam Music Group in 2004. Carey's deals with both Def Jam and Epic were at a fraction of the $80 million deal Carey had previously signed with Virgin Records; Virgin later rescinded that deal after poor sales. That same month, it was announced that R&B group Jodeci had signed to the label and planned to release their first studio album in 20 years.

Wondaland Records, singer Janelle Monáe's imprint, entered into a joint venture with Epic in 2015. Acts on Wondaland include Jidenna, St. Beauty, Deep Cotton and Roman GianArthur.

In 2016, Jennifer Lopez returned to Sony Music, six years after leaving in favor of Island Def Jam and Capitol Records. Lopez's multi-album deal reunited her with Reid, whom she signed with at Island Def Jam in 2010.

In January 2017, 21 Savage signed to Epic. On May 11, 2017, it was announced that Reid would exit as the label's CEO. Following his exit, it was reported that Reid had been accused of sexual harassment by multiple Epic employees.

On April 23, 2019, it was announced that Rhone had been appointed as Chair and CEO of the label.

Formerly affiliated labels

 550 Music (1993–2000)
 Blue Sky (1974–1982)
 Caribou Records (1976–1985)
 Cold Chillin' Records (1993–1998)
 Date Records (1960s)
 Duble Kick Entertainment (2010–2015)
 Epic Records Nashville (? – May 2006)
 Epic Soundtrax (1992–1997)
 Epic Street (1993–1998)
 Cleveland International Records (1976–1983)
 CTI Records (1980)
 Tuff City Records (1983–1984)
 Hidden Beach Records (1998–2007)
 Glacial Pace (mid–1990s)
 Invictus Records (1973–1976)
 Jet Records (1978–1983)
 Kirshner Records (1974–1983)
 MJJ Music (1988–2001)
 MLD Entertainment (2010–2017)
 Nemperor Records (1977–1990)
 Ode Records (1967–1969, 1976–1979)
 OKeh Records (1965–1970, 1994–2000)
 Pasha Records (1979–1990)
 Philadelphia International Records (1971–1984)
 Portrait Records (1976–1992)
 Ruthless Records (1990, 1999–2009)
 Scotti Brothers (1979–1988)
 SOLAR Records (1989–1993)
 Stone Music Entertainment (1994–2015)
 T-Neck Records (1972–1984)
 Tabu Records (1978–1991)
 The WORK Group (1994–1999)
 Virgin Records (1976–1978, 1982–1986)

Artists

Logos
Unlike sister label Columbia, Epic went through five different logos since its launch. Some logos were temporarily revived for period reissues. The years shown below list the time served as the label's primary logo.

See also 
 Epic Records Japan (Japanese branch of Epic Records)
 List of record labels
Immortal Records

References

External links
 
 Sony Music, Parent Company of Epic
 Epic Records album discography, 1962–1970

 
American record labels
Heavy metal record labels
Hip hop record labels
IFPI members
Jazz record labels
Record labels established in 1953
Pop record labels
Rock record labels
Contemporary R&B record labels
Rhythm and blues record labels
Sony Music